The Journal of Gastrointestinal Surgery is a monthly peer-reviewed medical journal covering surgery of the gastrointestinal tract. It was established in 1997 and originally published on behalf of the Society for Surgery of the Alimentary Tract by Elsevier, before transferring to Springer Science+Business Media in 2007. The editors-in-chief are Richard A. Hodin (Harvard Medical School) and Timothy M. Pawlik (Ohio State University).

Abstracting and indexing
The journal is abstracted and indexed in:

According to the Journal Citation Reports, the journal has a 2020 impact factor of 3.452.

References

External links

Surgery journals
Monthly journals
English-language journals
Publications established in 1997
Hybrid open access journals
Springer Science+Business Media academic journals